Netsky is a prolific family of computer worms which affect Microsoft Windows operating systems. The first variant appeared on Monday, February 16, 2004. The "B" variant was the first family member to find its way into mass distribution. It appeared on Wednesday, February 18, 2004. 18-year-old Sven Jaschan of Germany confessed to having written these, and other worms, such as Sasser. 

Although individual functions vary widely from virus to virus, the Netsky family perhaps is most famous for comments contained within the code of its variants insulting the authors of the Bagle and Mydoom worm families and, in some cases, routines that removed versions of these viruses. The "war" as it was referred to in the media caused a steady increase in the number of variant viruses produced in these families. As of June 2004, Bagle had approximately 28, Netsky approximately 29, and MyDoom approximately 10.

Other symptoms of Netsky included beeping sounds on specified dates, usually in the morning hours.

The worm was sent out as an e-mail, enticing recipients to open an attachment. Once opened, the attached program would scan the computer for e-mail addresses and e-mail itself to all addresses found.

Until October 2006, the P variant of this virus remained the most prevalent virus being sent in e-mail throughout the world, despite being over two and a half years old. It was surpassed by a variant from the Stration malware family in November 2006.

Drum and bass musician Netsky has based his artist name on this computer worm. The idea behind it was that there was a chance people would download the virus if they searched the internet to illegally download his music.

See also 
 Timeline of notable computer viruses and worms
 Computer virus
 Computer worms
 Sasser (computer worm)

References

External links 
 Netsky and Sasser author arrested
 Netsky and Sasser author trial 

Email worms
Hacking in the 2000s
2004 in computing